The Horticultural Trades Association (HTA) is the main trade association for garden centres and landscape gardeners (also known as ornamental horticulture), and associated products, in the United Kingdom.

History
The HTA was founded in 1899. It was incorporated as a company on 12 August 1920. The UK industry is worth £6 billion each year.

Structure
It is headquartered at the new Horticulture House in Chilton, Oxfordshire, a half-mile east of the main large science park, and a conference centre. Before October 2016, it was formerly at Theale in West Berkshire, south of the M4.

The Garden Centre Association was formerly run at the HTA offices, but is now in Cheshire. The Association of Professional Landscapers (APL) is a division of the HTA formed in 1995, and is headquartered also at Horticulture House.

It has around 1,500 garden retailers and manufacturers in its organisation, and is part of the AIPH.

AIPH
Also at Horticulture House is the AIPH (International Association of Horticultural Producers or Association Internationale des Producteurs de l'Horticulture). The Secretary General of the AIPH is an executive of the HTA.

Function
Since 1962 it has run the National Garden Gift Voucher scheme.

It runs the British Ornamental Plant Producers' (BOPP) Certification Scheme.

See also
 Commercial Horticultural Association, in Kent
 Flowers and Plants Association (FPA)

References

External links
 HTA

1899 establishments in the United Kingdom
Garden centres
Horticultural organisations based in the United Kingdom
Organisations based in Oxfordshire
Organizations established in 1899
Vale of White Horse